Narasingapuram is a village in the Papanasam taluk of Thanjavur district, Tamil Nadu, India.

Demographics 

As per the 2001 census, Narasingapuram had a total population of 776 with 392 males and 384 females. The sex ratio was 980. The literacy rate was 67.28.

References 

 

Villages in Thanjavur district